The Eparchy of Shamshabad is a Syro-Malabar Catholic Church ecclesiastical territory or eparchy of the Catholic Church  in Telangana, India. It was established by Pope Francis on 10 October 2017, and Raphael Thattil was appointed its first bishop. In a letter to the bishops of India, Francis cited India's decades of experience with "overlapping jurisdictions" of different sui iuris churches. He wrote: "With the growth of spiritual friendship and mutual assistance, any tension or apprehension should be swiftly overcome. May this extension of the pastoral area of the Syro-Malabar Church in no way be perceived as a growth in power and domination, but as a call to deeper communion, which should never be perceived as uniformity."

The new jurisdiction was inaugurated with Thattil's installation on 7 January 2018. The cathedral is the St. Alphonsa Syro-Malabar Catholic Church at Kukatpally, in Greater Hyderabad.

There are 130,000 Catholics in the Shamshabad diocese with eleven functional churches and seven under construction.

Auxiliary Bishops

Mar Joseph Kollamparambil
Mar Thomas Padiyath

References

External links
Catholic-Hierarchy.org
GCatholic.org
Official Website

Eastern Catholic dioceses in India
Syro-Malabar Catholic dioceses
2017 establishments in Telangana
Christian organizations established in 2017